There are four active member states of the Union of South American Nations after six member states suspended their participation in the organization in April 2018, while Ecuador and Uruguay announced their withdrawals in March 2019 and March 2020 respectively.

Member States

Suspended states 
Six member states suspended their participation in the organization in April 2018.

On 28 August 2018, Colombian president Iván Duque announced that foreign minister Carlos Holmes had officially notified Unasur of their intention to leave the bloc, effective in 6 months, denouncing it as an institution created by Hugo Chávez to sideline existing international treaties and referring to it as an accomplice to what they referred to as the dictatorship in Venezuela. Ecuador announced its withdrawal on 13 March 2019.  Uruguay followed suit in March 2020. Following the 2022 Brazilian general election, newly elected president Luiz Inácio Lula da Silva signalled his intention to rejoin UNASUR.

Non-member States

Observer States

Proposed Member States

References

External links

 
Union of South American Nations
South American